General Sir William Henry Bartholomew,  (16 March 1877 – 31 December 1962) was a senior British Army officer during the 1930s and a Colonel Commandant of the Royal Artillery.

Military career
Educated at Newton College, South Devon and the Royal Military Academy, Woolwich, Bartholomew was commissioned into the Royal Artillery on 23 March 1897. He was promoted to lieutenant on 23 March 1900, and to captain on 22 March 1902. He attended the Staff College, Quetta from 1909 to 1910.

Bartholomew served in the First World War initially as a General Staff Officer in 4th Division, and then as a brigadier general on the General Staff of XX Corps from 1917 and on the General Staff of the Egyptian Expeditionary Force from 1918.

After the war Bartholomew commanded the 6th Infantry Brigade from 1923 moving on to be Director of Recruiting and Organisation at the War Office in 1927. He was appointed Commandant of the Imperial Defence College in 1929 and Director of Military Operations and Intelligence at the War Office in 1931. He became Chief of the General Staff in India in 1934 and then General Officer Commanding-in-Chief for Northern Command in 1937; he retired in 1940 during the Second World War.

Bartholomew was made an Aide de Camp General to the King from 1938 to 1940 and Colonel Commandant of the Royal Artillery from 1934 to 1937.

After the Army
In retirement, Bartholomew served as North Eastern Regional Commissioner for Civil Defence between 1940 and 1945. He lived at Claxton Hall near York. He donated over £20,000 in 1921 to the Public Dispensary and Hospital, Leeds; later becoming world-renowned St James' Teaching Hospital.

References

Bibliography

External links
British Army Officers 1939–1945
Final Report of The Bartholomew Committee On Lessons To Be Learnt From The Operations In Flanders
Generals of World War II

 

|-

|-
 

|-
 

1877 births
1962 deaths
British Army generals
British Army personnel of World War I
British Army generals of World War II
Companions of the Distinguished Service Order
Companions of the Order of St Michael and St George
Graduates of the Staff College, Quetta
Knights Grand Cross of the Order of the Bath
Royal Artillery officers
Military personnel from Wiltshire
Graduates of the Royal Military Academy, Woolwich